This list of disasters in Metro Manila by death toll includes both natural and man-made disasters that took place in the general vicinity of Metro Manila in the Philippines. This list is not comprehensive in general.

Over 100,000 deaths

10,000 to 100,000 deaths

1,000 to 9,999 deaths

100 to 999 deaths

Epidemics

References

History of Metro Manila
Disasters in the Philippines
Metro Manila disasters by death toll
Metro Manola disasters by death toll
Disasters